The Nebraska Cornhuskers women's basketball team represents the University of Nebraska–Lincoln in the Big Ten Conference of NCAA Division I. The program became a varsity sport in 1975 and has since made fifteen appearances in the NCAA tournament, reaching the Sweet Sixteen twice. NU's longest-tenured head coach was Connie Yori, who led the Cornhuskers to a record-breaking 32–2 season in 2009–10.

The team has been coached by former Cornhusker player Amy Williams since 2016.

History

Early years
Nebraska's women's basketball program started as a club sport in 1970 and became a varsity sport five years later. In its first season, George Nicodemus led the team to a 22–9 record and the second round of the AIAW Tournament. NU cycled through five head coaches over the next fifteen years until Angela Beck was hired in 1986. In 1988, Beck led the Huskers to a Big Eight title and their first NCAA Tournament. Nebraska returned to the tournament two other times under Beck until she left the program in 1996. Paul Sanderford was hired to replace Beck and he took the Cornhuskers to the tournament in 1998, 1999, and 2000.

Connie Yori (2002–16)
When Sanderford resigned due to health concerns following the 2002 season, NU hired Connie Yori from Creighton to lead the program. The Huskers struggled through Yori's first season, finishing 8–20 and last in the Big 12.  In Yori's second season, NU improved to 18–12 and was invited to play in the WNIT, the program's first postseason tournament since 2000. Yori coached the Huskers to the best season in school history in 2009–10. Led by national player of the year finalist Kelsey Griffin, Nebraska started 30–0 and finished the regular season ranked No. 3 in the country, the highest ranking in school history. NU ended the year 32–2, reaching the Sweet Sixteen for the first time, and Yori was named national coach of the year. Nebraska joined the Big Ten the following season. Yori's program won the Big Ten tournament in 2014.

Yori resigned in 2016 following an athletic department investigation into reports that she mistreated her players. She left Nebraska as the program's all-time wins leader, coaching two AP All-Americans and twenty-one all-conference selections during her fourteen-year tenure.

Amy Williams (2016–present)
Following Yori's departure, Nebraska hired Amy Williams to lead the program.  Williams, who played at NU from 1994 to 1998, began her head coaching career at NAIA Rogers State, starting the program from scratch. She spent four years at South Dakota, guiding the Coyotes to two Summit League titles, an NCAA Tournament berth, and the 2016 WNIT championship. After a 7–22 debut season at NU, Williams led Nebraska to a 21–11 record in 2017–18. The Cornhuskers tied for third place in the Big Ten and Williams was named the conference's coach of the year.

Coaches

Coaching history

Coaching staff

Pinnacle Bank Arena

The program plays its home games at Pinnacle Bank Arena, a $181 million multi-use facility completed in 2013. The arena, located in Lincoln's Haymarket District, has a listed capacity of 15,500 for basketball games.  The team has finished in the top 25 in average home attendance every year since moving to Pinnacle Bank Arena. Prior to the opening of Pinnacle Bank Arena, Nebraska's men's and women's basketball teams played their home games at the Bob Devaney Sports Center.

Players

Retired numbers

Huskers in the WNBA

NCAA tournament results
The Cornhuskers have appeared in the NCAA tournament fifteen times with a combined record of 8–15.

Season-by-season results

Notes

References